Nigel Hayes-Davis ( Hayes; born December 16, 1994) is an American professional basketball player for Fenerbahçe of the Turkish Basketbol Süper Ligi and the EuroLeague. He played college basketball for the Wisconsin Badgers. Hayes attended Whitmer High School in Toledo, Ohio.

High school career

College career
In his freshman season, Hayes played significant minutes, earning Big Ten 6th man of the year and was named to the Big Ten All-Freshman team.

Hayes was the third-leading scorer on the Badgers' national runner-up squad and named third team All-Big Ten as a sophomore.

In his junior season, Hayes was named to the first team All-Big Ten after leading the Badgers in scoring (15.7 points per game), assists (3.0) and free-throw attempts (258) and finished second in rebounds (5.8 per game).

Coming into his senior season, Hayes was named Preseason Big Ten Player of the Year. He averaged 14.0 points, 6.7 rebounds, and 2.7 assists per game during his senior year at Wisconsin.

Hayes graduated in May 2017 with a degree in business finance and investment banking. He was noted for being an outspoken athlete and a leader on issues such as racial justice and compensation of NCAA athletes.

College statistics

|-
| style="text-align:left;"| 2013–14
| style="text-align:left;"| Wisconsin
| 38 || 0 || 17.4 || .510 || .000 || .585 || 2.8 || 0.9 || 0.8 || 0.5 || 7.7
|-
| style="text-align:left;"| 2014–15
| style="text-align:left;"| Wisconsin
| 40 || 40 || 32.9 || .497 || .396 || .744 || 6.2 || 2.0 || 0.9 || 0.4 || 12.4
|-
| style="text-align:left;"| 2015–16
| style="text-align:left;"| Wisconsin
| 35 || 35 || 36.2 || .368 || .293 || .736 || 5.8 || 3.0 || 1.1 || 0.4 || 15.7
|-
| style="text-align:left;"| 2016–17
| style="text-align:left;"| Wisconsin
| 37 || 37 || 32.4 || .457 || .314 || .587 || 6.6 || 2.7 || 0.8 || 0.4 || 14.0
|-
| style="text-align:center;" colspan="2"| Career
| 150 || 112 || 29.6 || .446 || .332 || .666 || 5.3 || 2.1 || 0.9 || 0.4 || 12.4

Professional career

Westchester Knicks (2017–2018)
After going undrafted in the 2017 NBA draft, he joined the New York Knicks for the 2017 NBA Summer League. On August 19, he signed a partially guaranteed deal with the team. On October 14, 2017, he was waived by New York. He was later assigned to the Westchester Knicks affiliate squad for the NBA G League for the majority of the season.

Los Angeles Lakers (2018)
On January 19, 2018, Hayes signed a 10-day contract with the Los Angeles Lakers. He made his NBA debut two days later in a 127–107 win over the New York Knicks, playing a single minute that night. The Lakers would not give Hayes a second 10-day contract after his first one expired, and subsequently the Westchester Knicks re-acquired Hayes on January 30.

Toronto Raptors (2018)
On March 6, 2018, the Toronto Raptors signed Hayes to a 10-day contract. On March 12, 2018, Hayes made his debut for the Toronto Raptors scoring 6 points on two 3-point field goals in 5 minutes played in a 132–106 win against the New York Knicks, the affiliate to the Westchester Knicks. On March 14, 2018, the Raptors re-signed Hayes to an additional 10-day contract. While on his second ten-day contract, Hayes was assigned to the Raptors 905, Toronto's G League franchise. Hayes did not receive a rest-of-season offer from the Raptors and returned to the Westchester Knicks.

Sacramento Kings (2018)
On March 31, 2018, the Sacramento Kings announced that they had signed Hayes for the rest of 2017–18 season. On July 7, 2018, he was waived by the Kings.

Galatasaray (2018–2019)
On August 29, 2018, Hayes signed with Galatasaray of the Turkish Basketbol Süper Ligi (BSL). Hayes averaged 12.6 points per game, 2.0 assists per game and 5.4 rebounds per game. Hayes averaged 15.7 points, 5.6 rebounds and 1.8 assists in the EuroCup.

Žalgiris (2019–2021)
On June 12, 2019, Hayes signed with Žalgiris Kaunas of the Lithuanian Basketball League. He re-signed with the team on July 17, 2020.

Barcelona (2021–2022)
On August 22, 2021, Hayes signed with FC Barcelona of the Spanish Liga ACB.

Fenerbahçe (2022–present)
On July 22, 2022, Hayes-Davis signed a one-year deal with Turkish powerhouse Fenerbahçe.

Personal life
In 2021, Hayes changed his surname to Hayes-Davis in honor of his stepfather.

Career statistics

NBA

Regular season

|-
| style="text-align:left;"| 
| style="text-align:left;"| L.A. Lakers
| 2 || 0 || 5.5 || .333 || .000 || 1.000 || .0 || 1.0 || .0 || .0 || 1.5
|-
| style="text-align:left;"| 
| style="text-align:left;"| Toronto
| 2 || 0 || 3.3 || 1.000 || 1.000 || .000 || .0 || .0 || .0 || .0 || 3.0
|-
| style="text-align:left;"|
| style="text-align:left;"| Sacramento
| 5 || 0 || 21.0 || .333 || .167 || .000 || 4.4 || .8 || .4 || .6 || 3.6
|-
|style="text-align:center;" colspan="2"|Career
| 9 || 0 || 13.6 || .333 || .250 || .333 || 2.4 || .7 || .2 || .3 || 3.0
|-

EuroLeague

|-
| style="text-align:left;"| 2019–20
| style="text-align:left;" rowspan=2| Žalgiris
| 28 || 10 || 22.3 || .404 || .372 || .758 || 3.5 || 1.0 || .4 || .2 || 6.3 || 6.6
|-
| style="text-align:left;"| 2020–21
| 33 || 30 || 26.7 || .443 || .443 || .894 || 3.9 || 1.2 || 1.1 || .2 || 9.5 || 9.8
|-
| style="text-align:left;"| 2021–22
| style="text-align:left;"| Barcelona
| 37 || 16 || 18.9 || .367 || .244 || .800 || 2.1 || .8 || .5 || .1 || 4.2 || 4.0
|-
| style="text-align:left;"| 2022–23
| style="text-align:left;"| Fenerbahçe
| 8 || 8 || 27.5 || .463 || .345 || .750 || 3.5 || 1.2 || 1.4 || .1 || 9.0 || 11.9
|- class="sortbottom"
| style="text-align:center;" colspan=2| Career
| 106 || 64 || 22.9 || .416 || .380 || .816 || 3.1 || 1.0 || .7 || .2 || 6.7 || 7.1

References

External links

Nigel Hayes at EuroLeague
Nigel Hayes at Wisconsin Badgers
Nigel Hayes at ESPN.com
Nigel Hayes at Rivals.com

1994 births
Living people
21st-century African-American sportspeople
African-American basketball players
American expatriate basketball people in Canada
American expatriate basketball people in Lithuania
American expatriate basketball people in Spain
American expatriate basketball people in Turkey
American men's basketball players
Basketball players from Ohio
BC Žalgiris players
FC Barcelona Bàsquet players
Fenerbahçe men's basketball players
Galatasaray S.K. (men's basketball) players
Liga ACB players
Los Angeles Lakers players
People from Westerville, Ohio
Power forwards (basketball)
Raptors 905 players
Sacramento Kings players
Small forwards
Sportspeople from Toledo, Ohio
Toronto Raptors players
Undrafted National Basketball Association players
Westchester Knicks players
Wisconsin Badgers men's basketball players